The following are the telephone codes in Senegal.

Prefixes

List of area codes in Senegal

Area codes are prefixed with 30 or 33 depending on the operator.

Mobile allocations

See also 

 Telecommunications in Senegal

References

Senegal
Telecommunications in Senegal
Telephone numbers